Aminoadipate-semialdehyde dehydrogenase is a protein that in humans is encoded by the AASDH gene.

Function

This gene encodes a member of the non-ribosome peptide synthetase (NRPS) enzyme family. The encoded protein contains an AMP-binding domain, PP-binding (phosphopantetheine, or pantetheine 4'phosphate-binding) domain and the Pyrrolo-quinoline quinon (PQQ) binding domain. The protein is expressed in several adult tissues.

References

Further reading